Tomago is a combined industrial/semi-rural suburb of the Port Stephens local government area in the Hunter Region of New South Wales, Australia. It is located just north of the Hunter River and west of the body of water known as Fullerton Cove. Tomago means "sweet water" in the local Aboriginal language. In 2016 277 lived in Tomago with a median age of 55, 72.7% born in Australia and 80.4% only speaking English at home.

Geography
Tomago is primarily flat with sandy soil and is surrounded on three sides by water. The Hunter River flows around the western and southern borders of the suburb. To the east is Fullerton Cove. There is no direct access to the land portion of the neighbouring suburbs of Tarro, Kooragang or Fullerton Cove. Access to and from Hexham is only possible via the Hexham bridges, which are actually located in the suburb of Tarro.

Industry
Major industrial sites in the area are the Tomago aluminium smelter, Forgacs Shipyard, and the Tomago Sandbeds water treatment works. Until 1999, ABB Engineering Construction manufactured coal wagons for the Hunter Valley Coal Chain. In 2009 Volgren opened a factory to body buses, it closed in 2012.

Hunter Region Botanic Gardens
The Hunter Region Botanic Gardens are adjacent to the eastern side of the Pacific Highway in the north of the suburb.

Tomago House 
Tomago House and its nearby chapel are heritage listed buildings on Tomago Road, the main road through the suburb, which provides access from the Pacific Highway to Newcastle Airport.

Notes

References

Suburbs of Port Stephens Council